Carl of Sweden (in English, also often: Charles; in Swedish, also officially: Karl) may refer to:

Carl III to Carl VI, regal ordinals used only according to fictitious lists of Swedish kings
Charles VII of Sweden, actually Carl I, King of Sweden 1161–1167
Charles VIII of Sweden, actually Carl II, King of Sweden 15th century (and of Norway as Carl I)
Charles IX of Sweden, Carl IX, King of Sweden 1604–1611
Charles X Gustav of Sweden, Carl X Gustav, King of Sweden 1654–1660
Charles XI of Sweden, Carl XI, King of Sweden 1660–1697
Charles XII of Sweden, Carl XII, King of Sweden 1697–1718
Charles XIII of Sweden, Carl XIII, King of Sweden 1809–1818 (and of Norway as Carl II)
Charles XIV John of Sweden, Carl XIV John, King of Sweden 1818–1844 (and of Norway as Carl III John)
Charles XV of Sweden, Carl XV, King of Sweden 1859–1872 (and of Norway as Carl IV)
Carl XVI Gustaf of Sweden, Carl XVI Gustaf, King of Sweden from 1973
Carl, Prince of Sweden circa 1182, son of King Sverker II of Sweden or Sweartgar II
Carl, Prince of Sweden 1470, son of King Charles VIII of Sweden or Carl II
Carl, Prince of Sweden 1544, son of King Gustav I of Sweden (died in infancy)
Charles Philip, Duke of Södermanland or Carl Philip, Prince of Sweden 1601
Carl Gustav, Prince of Sweden 1686, son of King Charles XI of Sweden or Carl XI (died in infancy)
Charles Frederick, Duke of Holstein-Gottorp, Carl Frederick, Swedish prince 1700 and/or pretender to the throne
Prince Carl Gustav, Duke of Småland 1782, son of till King Gustav III (died in infancy)
Carl Adolph, Prince of Sweden 1798, son of King Charles XIII of Sweden, Carl XIII (died in infancy)
Carl Gustav, Prince of Sweden 1802, son of till King Gustav IV Adolf of Sweden (died in infancy)
Charles August, Crown Prince of Sweden, Carl August, Crown Prince of Sweden 1810
Prince Carl Oscar, Duke of Södermanland, Prince of Sweden and Norway 1852
Prince Carl, Duke of Västergötland, Prince of Sweden and Norway 1861
Carl, Prince Bernadotte, Prince of Sweden 1911
Carl Johan Bernadotte (legal name), Prince of Sweden 1916
Prince Carl Philip, Duke of Värmland, Prince of Sweden 1979